Montrose Mansion and Chapel, originally known as Montrose Mansion, is a historic home located on the campus of Camp Fretterd Military Reservation of the Maryland Army National Guard in Reisterstown, Baltimore County, Maryland.  It is a two-story neoclassical stone house constructed originally about 1826 by William Patterson who gave it to his grandson, Jerome Napoleon Bonaparte as a wedding present. By the middle of the 19th century, a large two-story wing was added, then a mansard roof with round-top dormers, a cupola, and a bracketed cornice with pendants was added about 1880. The chapel was completed in 1855 and is a rectangular structure of stone with Greek Revival decorative detailing.  It features a three-story bell and entrance tower.

The mansion and tower are separated by about a quarter of a mile.

It was listed on the National Register of Historic Places in 1990.

References

External links
, including photo from 1978, at Maryland Historical Trust
History of Juvenile Justice in Maryland website

Houses on the National Register of Historic Places in Maryland
Churches in Baltimore County, Maryland
Houses in Baltimore County, Maryland
1820s architecture in the United States
Federal architecture in Maryland
Greek Revival architecture in Maryland
Second Empire architecture in Maryland
Churches completed in 1855
Reisterstown, Maryland
National Register of Historic Places in Baltimore County, Maryland
Patterson family of Maryland